Buruntuma is a village in the Gabú Region of north-eastern Guinea-Bissau. It lies on the border with Guinea, to the southeast of Canquelifá.

History
On 24 February 1970, a group of terrorists attacked Buruntuma with heavy guns and grenades; it became known as the "Buruntuma massacre".

References

External links
Maplandia World Gazetteer

Populated places in Guinea-Bissau
Gabu Region